Ryongsŏng-guyŏk, or Ryongsŏng District (룡성구역) is one of the 18 guyŏk that constitute Pyongyang, North Korea.
Ryongsong Residence, the main residence of Kim Jong-un is located in this district.

Following a Standing Committee of the Supreme People's Assembly decision on 15 January 2023, Ryongmun-dong was renamed to Ryongmun 1-dong, and Hwasong-dong was renamed to Ryongmun 2-dong.

Administrative divisions
Ryongsŏng-guyŏk is divided into 15 tong (neighbourhoods):

 Chung'i-dong 중이동 (中二洞)
 Ch'ŏnggyŏ-dong 청계동 (淸溪洞)
 Masan-dong 마산동 (馬山洞)
 Myŏng'o-dong 명오동 (明梧洞)
 Ŏ'ŭn-dong 어은동 (御恩洞)
 Rimwŏn-dong 림원동 (林原洞)
 Ryongch'u 1-dong 룡추 1동 (龍秋 1洞)
 Ryongch'u 2-dong 룡추 2동 (龍秋 2洞)
 Ryonggung 1-dong 룡궁 1동 (龍宮 1洞)
 Ryonggung 2-dong 룡궁 2동 (龍宮 2洞)
 Ryongmun 1-dong 룡문1동 (龍門1洞)
 Ryongmun 2-dong 룡문2동 (龍門2洞)
 Ryongsŏng 1-dong 룡성 1동 (龍城 1洞)
 Ryongsŏng 2-dong 룡성 2동 (龍城 2洞)
 Taech'ŏn-dong 대천동 (大泉洞)

Mountains
Hyongjesan

See also
Residences of North Korean leaders

References

Districts of Pyongyang